The lieutenant governor of Nebraska is the highest-ranking executive official in the State of Nebraska after the governor. According to the Nebraska State Constitution, in the event a governor dies, becomes permanently incapacitated, resigns, or is removed from office, the lieutenant governor will become governor.

Prior to the Constitution of 1875, Nebraska had no office of lieutenant governor. If the governor died, resigned, or was removed from office (as happened to Governor David Butler in 1871), then the Nebraska Secretary of State was appointed as Acting Governor until the vacancy would be filled by the next election. The Constitution of 1875 created the office of Lieutenant Governor of Nebraska, leading to the first election of a lieutenant governor in Nebraska in the election of 1876.

Prior to 1962, both the governor and the lieutenant governor were elected to two-year terms, but in 1962, voters approved a constitutional amendment providing that the governor and lieutenant governor would be elected to four-year terms beginning in 1966. However, prior to 1974, the governor and the lieutenant governor ran independently and were elected on separate tickets in the general election, which is why sometimes Nebraska had a governor from one party but a lieutenant governor from another. Starting in 1974, due to a constitutional amendment, the process was changed such that the governor and lieutenant governor candidates would secure their nominations independently in the primary elections in their respective parties, but then they ran together in the general election on one ticket from the same political party. Finally, by 2002, the constitution was again amended to allow gubernatorial candidates choose their nominee for lieutenant governor after winning their respective parties’ primary elections, which means that the lieutenant governor is no longer elected independently of the governor at any stage.

By law, the lieutenant governor presides over the Nebraska Legislature, acts as governor when the governor is out of the state or is incapacitated, and performs other duties assigned to him or her by the governor. Nebraska’s lieutenant governor also serves as the director of homeland security for the state and as the chairman of the Governor’s Homeland Security Policy Group. Before 1971, the office of lieutenant governor was considered a part-time position except during the biennial legislative session. When the Legislature began meeting annually, the office of lieutenant governor became a full-time position.

As the highest-ranking presiding officer of the Nebraska Legislature, the lieutenant governor is known officially as the president of the Legislature. When presiding, the lieutenant governor may vote to break a tie in the Legislature on any matter except when the vote is on the final passage of a bill. The lieutenant governor, in the role of presiding officer, also signs all bills and resolutions passed by the Legislature.

List
Parties

Notes

See also
List of governors of Nebraska

References

External links
Nebraska Blue Book (PDF)

Lieutenant Governors
Nebraska